Master of the Children is a title awarded to an adult musician who is put in charge of the musical training, and in some cases the general education (which sometimes gets offered as a priceless perk to recruit the best singers) of choir boy (or since the late 20th century in a growing number of choirs boys and girls), as was common in major church choirs, often attached to a cathedral, monastery, collegiate church or court chapel, such as the musically particularly significant English Chapel royal, to train the young recruits (not just as future adult singers but at least as much because their treble -boy soprano- the voice was considered angelic, hence liturgically ideal).

References

Positions within the British Royal Household
Music educators